Hanon Systems Co., Ltd. is an automotive parts manufacturing company headquartered in Daejeon, South Korea. Hanon Systems is one of the world's largest suppliers of auto thermal management systems.

History
Hanon Systems was initially established as Halla Climate Control, a joint venture between Ford and Mando Machinery, in 1986. During the Asian financial crisis in 1999, Halla Group, a parent company of Mando, went bankrupt and sold its entire stake in the joint venture to Visteon under Ford. After Visteon's takeover, Ford integrated Visteon's thermal system businesses into Halla Climate Control and changed its name to Halla Visteon Climate Control (HVCC) in 2013.

In 2015, Visteon sold its 70% stake in HVCC to a consortium led by Hahn & Company, a South Korean private equity investment firm, and Hankook Tire. HVCC was renamed Hanon Systems after the acquisition. In 2019, Hanon Systems acquired Magna International's fluid pressure and control unit for US$1.23 billion.

See also
 Automotive industry in South Korea

References

External links
 

South Korean companies established in 1986
Companies listed on the Korea Exchange
Auto parts suppliers of South Korea
Automotive companies established in 1986
Companies based in Daejeon